Corrosella astierii is a species of small brackish water snails with an operculum, aquatic gastropod mollusks in the family Hydrobiidae. 

This species is endemic to France.

References

External links
 Delicado D., Machordom A. & Ramos M.A. (2015). Effects of habitat transition on the evolutionary patterns of the microgastropod genus Pseudamnicola (Mollusca, Hydrobiidae). Zoologica Scripta. 44(4): 403-417.

Endemic molluscs of Metropolitan France
Gastropods described in 1851